The 1968 Swedish Open was a combined men's and women's tennis tournament played on outdoor clay courts held in Båstad, Sweden. It was the 21st edition of the tournament and was held in July 1968. Martin Mulligan won the singles title.

Finals

Men's singles

 Martin Mulligan defeated  Ion Țiriac 8–6, 6–4, 6–4

Women's singles

 Julie Heldman defeated  Kathleen Harter default

Men's doubles

 Arthur Ashe /  Clark Graebner defeated  Manuel Santana /  Manuel Orantes 7–5, 6–1

Women's doubles

 Eva Lundqvist /  Olga Morozova defeated  Julie Heldman /  Kathleen Harter 6–4, 6–4

References

External links
 Official tournament website

Swedish Open
Swedish Open
Swedish Open
Swedish Open